Polly of the Movies is a 1927 American silent comedy film directed by Scott Pembroke and starring Jason Robards, Gertrude Short and Corliss Palmer. It is loosely based on Harry Leon Wilson's 1922 novel Merton of the Movies and its various film adaptations.

Synopsis
A small town girl goes to Hollywood with ambitions of becoming major dramatic star. However, the melodrama she appears in is unintentionally amusing and becomes a comedy hit.

Cast
 Jason Robards as Angus Whitcomb 
 Gertrude Short as Polly Primrose 
 Corliss Palmer as Lisa Smith 
 Stuart Holmes as Benjamin Wellington Fairmount 
 Jack Richardson as Rolland Harrison 
 Rose Dione as Lulu Fairmount
 Mary Foy as Mrs. Beardsley

References

Bibliography
 Robert J. Lentz. Gloria Grahame, Bad Girl of Film Noir: The Complete Career. McFarland, 2014.

External links

1927 films
1927 comedy films
Silent American comedy films
Films directed by Scott Pembroke
American silent feature films
1920s English-language films
American black-and-white films
Films about filmmaking
1920s American films